RC3, or variants may refer to:

RC3: precision running fits, a class of engineering fit used in the United States
Republic RC-3 Seabee, an amphibious sports aircraft
SJ Rc3, a model of SJ Rc class electric locomotive used in Sweden
State Highway RC-3 (Puducherry), a state highway in Puducherry, India; see List of state highways in Puducherry
RC3, one of six RC algorithms, symmetric-key encryption algorithms invented by Ron Rivesta
rC3 (Remote Chaos Experience), remote events of the Chaos Communication Congress in 2020 and 2021
RC3 or Reginald Cornelius III, a fictional character in Knight Rider (season 4)

See also
Release candidate, a software release version with potential to be a stable product
RC (disambiguation)
R3 (disambiguation)
C3 (disambiguation)